Farewell and Welcome Live 1998 is a live recording by the Japanese Jazz fusion band T-Square released on July 18, 1998 and made available on VHS. The concert was held to bid farewell to Masato Honda and Hirotaka Izumi who were leaving the band, and to welcome their replacements Takahiro Miyazaki and Tadashi Namba.

The Live Concert took place at Chicken George in Kobe, Japan, on April 28th, 1998.
Many songs were performed on this setlist that were not included on the VHS release.

Track listing

VHS
Sources

Full Performance
Source

Part 1
 Megalith
 Romantic City
 Play For You
 Takarajima
 Bad Moon
 Omens of Love

Part 2
 The Seven Wonders
 Sailing The Ocean
 One Step Beyond
 Explorer

Part 3
 Miss You
 Jubilee
 Truth

First Encore
 Forgotten Saga
 Japanese Soul Brothers

Second Encore
 Knight's Song
 Little Mermaid

Personnel
 Hirotaka Izumi - Keyboards, Acoustic Piano
 Hiroyuki Noritake - Drums
 Masahiro Andoh - Acoustic & Electric guitars
 Masato Honda - Saxophone, EWI
 Mitsuru Sutoh - Bass guitar
 Tadashi Namba - Keyboards
 Takahiro Miyazaki - Saxophone

References

1998 live albums